Ira Eliezer Tapé (born 31 August 1997) is an Ivorian international footballer who plays as a goalkeeper for Ivorian side FC San Pedro.

Career statistics

International

References

External links
 

1997 births
Living people
Ivorian footballers
Association football goalkeepers
Aspire Academy (Qatar) players
SOA (football club) players
FC San-Pédro players
Ligue 1 (Ivory Coast) players
Ivory Coast youth international footballers
Ivory Coast international footballers
Ivorian expatriate footballers
Ivorian expatriate sportspeople in Qatar
Expatriate footballers in Qatar
Footballers at the 2020 Summer Olympics
Olympic footballers of Ivory Coast